The first elections to the newly created Adur District Council established by the Local Government Act 1972 in England and Wales were held 7 June 1973. Overall turnout was recorded at 46.6%.

The election resulted in no overall control.

Election result

This resulted in the following composition of the council:

Ward results

References

1973
1973 English local elections
1970s in West Sussex